Therese Schroeder-Sheker is a musician, educator, clinician, and academic dean of the School of Music-Thanatology, which was housed at St. Patrick Hospital in Missoula, Montana from 1992 to 2002.

Schroeder-Sheker, using voice and harp, works as a music-thanatologist, a relatively new discipline, where the practitioner works with those who are actively dying (24–48 hours) or have received a terminal diagnosis with a life expectancy of less than six months. The goals of music-thanatology include reduction of physical as well as emotional pain, creation of a supportive environment while dying, helping the patient become more conscious of their own death process, and changing the approach to death within established structures (hospices, hospitals, etc.). Schroeder-Sheker was honored by the New York Open Center  in 1997 for her "Music Thanatology". Her music has been used in documentaries and released commercially.

CD and Video

Schroeder-Sheker has produced numerous recorded works. Among those works are:

Celebrant: The Historical Harp, (cassette tape),  Lady Reason Records. (1984)
The Queen's Minstrel, (CD) Windham Hill Records. (1988), Valley Entertainment. (2011)
Rosa Mystica, Celestial Harmonies (1989)
In Dulci Jubilo (Sweet Joy) Celestial Harmonies (1991)
Inside the Miracle:  Enduring Illness, Approaching Wholeness, spoken words by Mark Nepo. Parabola AudioTapes (1996)
Chalice of Repose:  A Contemplative Musician's Approach to Death and Dying. videotape, 1997 (Palm Springs International Film Festival first place award).
Therese Schroeder-Sheker and The Chalice of Repose Project: A Contemplative Musician's Approach to Death and Dying", DVD, Pleroma Press, 2007.

References

"I Heard the Call of the Seraph", essay in the anthology So That You May be One: From the Visions of Joa Bolendas, Lindisfarne Books, 1997.Transitus: A Blessed Death in the Modern World monograph, St. Dunstan's Press, 2001.

1991 – The Chalice of Repose at St. Thomas, television video documentary, Jim Phelan Productions, Denver, Colorado.

1993 – “Music for the Dying: The New Field of Music-Thanatology,” in Advances, Journal of Mind/Body Health, Volume 9, Number 1, John E. Fetzer Institute.

1994-2000  Chalice of Repose Project Clinical Handbook, 1st-4th editions. St. Dunstan’s Press.

1994 – “Music for the Dying, “ in Noetic Sciences Review, Number 31

1994 – “Music for the Dying,” in Caduceus, Issue 23, London

1994 – “Music for the Dying: A Personal Account of the New Field of Music-Thanatology – History, Theories, and Clinical Narratives,” in Journal of Holistic Nursing, Volume 12, No. 1, Sage Periodicals Press.

1995 – The Chalice of Repose Project, television documentary for CNN News, producer Dan Rutz.

1996 – “Death and the Chalice of Repose Project: Prescriptive Music and the Art of Dying,” in Lapis: Inner Meaning and Contemporary Life, Volume 2, New York Open Center Publications.

1996 – Inside the Miracle: Enduring Illness, Approaching Wholeness, Mark Nepo and Therese Schroeder-Sheker, Parabola Audio Library.

1996 – The Gift: the Chalice of Repose Project, Christopher Award-winning television documentary for ABC.

1996 – Therese Schroeder-Sheker: Music and the Art of Dying, PBS television broadcast for Thinking Allowed, producer, Dr. Jeffrey Mishlove.

1997 – Therese Schroeder-Sheker and The Chalice of Repose: A Contemplative Musician’s Approach to Death and Dying, a Fetzer-funded documentary video and 19 page program guide, producers Paul & Jennifer Kaufman, Sounds True.

1998 – “Shaping a Sanctuary with Sound: Music-Thanatology and the Care of the Dying,” Pastoral Music, Volume 22:3; National Association of Pastoral Musicians.

1998 – Heart Strings: Chalice of Repose Project, television documentary for NBC.

1998 – The Geography of the Soul, CD recording and 28 page booklet, Sapientia Music. 1998.

2001 – The Chalice of Repose Project: Changing the Way We Live and Die, Soule Family Foundation funded publication for Chalice of Repose Project, Missoula, Mt.

2001 – “Music-Thanatology and the Spiritual Care of the Dying,” Interview with Bonnie Horrigan in Alternative Therapies, Volume 7, Number 1.   InnoVision Communication.

2002 – “The Last Note: How Music Wakens and Heals,” in Parabola, Vol. 27, No. 2.

2003 – “Music-Thanatology and Spiritual Care of the Dying” in Voices of Integrative Medicine, edited by Bonnie Horrigan for Churchill Livingstone and Elsevier Science.

2004 – "Choosing Beauty: The Mystical Path of Increasing Invisibility" in Volume 5, Summer 2004 issue of Sophia, Journal of the School of Spiritual Psychology.

2004 – "Orpheus and the Eternal:  Faithfulness, Vision & Fine-Tuning" in Spring:  A Journal of Archetype and Culture # 71 - ORPHEUS.  September, 2004.

2005 – “Contemplative Musicianship and Liminality” for the Pleroma Press Contemplative Musicianship Series, Volume 1 of 10.

2005 – “Integration and Healing: Grief, Memory, Sleep, Joy,”  for the Pleroma Press Contemplative Musicianship Series, Volume 10 of 10. (also Volumes 2-9)

2006 – “The Principles of Prescriptive Music:Volumes 1-10,” for the Pleroma Press Music-Thanatology Series.

2006 – "The Vox Feminae: Choosing and Being as Christian Form and Praxis," chapter in Practicing Catholic: Ritual, Body and Contestation in Catholic Faith'', Palgrave Macmillan, 2006.

2007 – "Letting Go:  The Paradox of Cultural Competence in End-of-Life Care," article in the "Transitus" column of Explore: the Journal of Science and Healing, (Elsevier Science) Volume 3, Number 2, March 2007.

External links
 The Chalice of Repose Project, Inc. The Voice of Music-Thanatology 
 The Chalice of Repose Secure Online Gift Shop & Order Center 
What is Music-Thanatology?

References

American women composers
21st-century American composers
American harpists
Death in art
Living people
Year of birth missing (living people)
21st-century American women musicians
21st-century women composers